Kenneth Robert McKim (1925 – September 30, 2020) was a Canadian football player who played for the Toronto Argonauts and Saskatchewan Roughriders. He won the Grey Cup with Toronto in 1946 and 1947.

References

1925 births
2020 deaths
Players of Canadian football from Ontario
Saskatchewan Roughriders players
Toronto Argonauts players